Pepper Pike is a city in eastern Cuyahoga County, Ohio, United States. The population was 6,796 as of the 2020 census. It is an affluent suburb of the Cleveland metropolitan area.

History 
In 1763, sixteen pioneers settled the area along the eastern border of present-day Cuyahoga County. In 1763, Orange Township was established, which included the present municipalities of Pepper Pike, Hunting Valley, Moreland Hills, Orange Village and Woodmere. Orange Township was the birthplace of President James A. Garfield in 1831. By the late 1880s, dairy farming and cheese production became the primary industry of the township. In 1924, residents of the northwestern quadrant of Orange Township voted to separate, and the village of Pepper Pike was incorporated. The name "Pepper Pike" was supposedly selected after the Pepper family, who lived and worked along the primary transportation corridor (i.e., turnpike), although there are other theories about the name. Incorporated as a city in 1970, Pepper Pike operates under the mayor-council form of government. In the late 2000s, it was chosen as one of the top seven strangest city names by the World Book of Facts.

Homes in the city are required to have an area of one acre so that residents can enjoy bucolic surroundings. Pepper Pike has been named a "Tree City USA" several consecutive years by the National Arbor Day Foundation.

The RTA's greenline was originally planned to extend from Green Road to Brainard in Pepper Pike, but financial setbacks in the 1930s prevented its completion. The arrival of I-271 in the 1960s cemented the region's reliance on automobiles over the train system.

On November 15, 2019, a natural gas pipeline in Pepper Pike exploded.

Geography
Pepper Pike is located at  (41.476836, -81.468975) in the eastern section of Cuyahoga County.

Demographics

The median income for a household in the city was $190,682, and the median income for a family was $166,765, per capita income for the city was $89,235. In 2020, Bloomberg named Pepper Pike the 43rd richest town in America.   About 5.2% of the total population were below the poverty line. Of the city's population over the age of 25, 78.1% held a bachelor's degree or higher.

2010 census
As of the census of 2010, there were 5,979 people, 2,176 households, and 1,753 families residing in the city. The racial makeup of the city was 86.3% White, 6.5% African American, 0.2% Native American, 5.5% Asian, 0.1% from other races, and 1.6% from two or more races. Hispanic or Latino of any race were 1.4% of the population.

There were 2,176 households, of which 31.3% had children under the age of 18 living with them, 73.5% were married couples living together, 5.7% had a female householder with no husband present, 1.4% had a male householder with no wife present, and 19.4% were non-families. 16.8% of all households were made up of individuals, and 9.4% had someone living alone who was 65 years of age or older. The average household size was 2.59 and the average family size was 2.91.

The median age in the city was 49.2 years. 23.6% of residents were under the age of 18; 6.4% were between the ages of 18 and 24; 14.1% were from 25 to 44; 32.5% were from 45 to 64; and 23.4% were 65 years of age or older. The gender makeup of the city was 46.5% male and 53.5% female.

2000 census
In 2000, there were 1,000 households, out of which 32.0% had children under the age of 18 living with them, 78.3% were married couples living together, 5.0% had a female householder with no husband present, and 15.7% were non-families. 14.0% of all households were made up of individuals. The average household size was 2.62 and the average family size was 2.88.

In the city, the population was spread out, with 23.6% under the age of 18, 4.8% from 18 to 24, 16.7% from 25 to 44, 34.5% from 45 to 64, and 20.3% who were 65 years of age or older. The median age was 48 years. For every 100 females, there were 91.6 males. For every 100 females age 18 and over, there were 84.5 males.

Pepper Pike's Israeli community had the twenty fifth highest percentage of residents, which was at 1.4% (tied with Plainview, NY).

Education
Pepper Pike is served by the Orange City School District, which also includes neighboring Hunting Valley, Moreland Hills, Orange, and Woodmere. The campus of Orange High School is located in Pepper Pike, along with the Orange Branch of the Cuyahoga County Public Library.

Ursuline College, a liberal-arts school founded in 1871, is located in Pepper Pike. The oldest Catholic women's college in Ohio, it has an enrollment of approximately 1,100 students as of 2018, and offers 30 undergraduate, nine graduate, and 10 degree-completion programs.

The Japanese Language School of Cleveland (JLSC; クリーブランド日本語補習校 Kurīburando Nihongo Hoshūkō), a part-time Japanese school, previously held its classes at the Lillian and Betty Ratner School in Pepper Pike.

Cemeteries 
 Orange Cemetery, Lander Circle & Chagrin Blvd.

Notable people

 Matt Dery, radio personality
 Vincent Marotta, entrepreneur, co-creator of Mr. Coffee
 Mark Rosewater, head designer of Magic the Gathering
 JD Samson, musician, producer, songwriter and DJ best known as a member of the bands Le Tigre and MEN
 Tara Seibel, artist and graphic novelist, best known for being the last cartoonist to work with Harvey Pekar, creator of American Splendor
 George Stephanopoulos, political advisor and television news journalist on ABC News, co-host of Good Morning America, and anchor of This Week
 Seth Taft, grandson of President William Howard Taft

Surrounding communities

References

External links
 City of Pepper Pike

Cities in Ohio
Cities in Cuyahoga County, Ohio
Populated places established in 1924
Populated places established in 1820
Cleveland metropolitan area